Bembradium is a genus of marine ray-finned fish belonging to the family Bembridae, the deepwater flatheads. These fishes are found in the Indian Ocean and the western Pacific Ocean.

Taxonomy
Bembradium was first proposed as a genus by the American ichthyologist Charles Henry Gilbert in 1905 when he described the new species, Bembradium roseum, from the Pailolo channel in the Hawaiian Islands. He designated his new species as the type species of the new monotypic genus. Subsequently the French ichthyologists Pierre Fourmanoir and Jacques Rivaton described a second species, B. furici, from the Isle of Pines in the Province Sud on Grande Terre in New Caledonia in 1979. In 2019 a third species was described from the Andaman Sea. In the 5th edition of Fishes of the World the genus is classified within the family Bembridae, the deep water flatheads. Other authorities classify the genus in the family Plectrogeniidae.

Species
There are currently 3 recognized species in this genus:
 Bembradium furici Fourmanoir & Rivaton, 1979
 Bembradium magnoculum Kishimoto, Kawai, Tashiro & Aungtonya, 2019
 Bembradium roseum C. H. Gilbert, 1905

Etymology
The genus name means “like Bembras”, the type genus of Bembridae.

Characteristics
Bembradium is diagnosed as a genus by the front part of the head behind very flattened, becoming less flattened to the rear. The lower jaw does not protrude. The suborbital ridge bears many spines. The origin of the pectoral fins is behind a vertical line through the origin of the pelvic fins. The lateral line runs through the centre of the flanks. The scales on the body are large.

Distribution and habitat
Bembradium deepwater flatheads are found in the Indo-Pacific region from the Andaman Sea to Hawaii. They are found in deep water.

References

Bembridae
Taxa named by Charles Henry Gilbert